Detour: A Hollywood Story is a 1988 memoir by Cheryl Crane, the only daughter of actress Lana Turner, with additional writing from Cliff Jahr. In the book, she recounts her early life, including her alleged sexual abuse by her stepfather Lex Barker, and the 1958 killing of Johnny Stompanato during a domestic struggle. She also details her coming out as a lesbian to her parents as a teenager, a fact that had not been publicly disclosed prior. The book went on to become a New York Times Best Seller.

Synopsis
The book follows Crane from her early life in Los Angeles growing up with her mother, Lana Turner, and father, Steve Crane, as well as her alleged sexual abuse by Lex Barker, her mother's fourth husband. It also recounts the 1958 killing of Johnny Stompanato during a domestic struggle between her mother and him at their Beverly Hills home in April 1958, which Crane marks as the point of "detour," after which she engaged in various illegal activities, including running away, using drugs, and attempting suicide in 1962. After her suicide attempt, Crane recounts her working for her father's Los Angeles restaurant, the Luau; her attending Cornell University; and her meeting of Joyce LeRoy, a model with whom she began a long-term relationship.

Critical response
Christopher Schemering of The Washington Post praised the book, referring to it as "a story of horror and healing -- a tale so preposterous that it borders on farce. But Crane tells her dense and complex story so straightforwardly -- and without a trace of self-pity -- that the vicissitudes reverberate into arias of emotion."

Kirkus Reviews noted of Detour:

References

External links
Detour: A Hollywood Story at Amazon

1988 non-fiction books
1980s LGBT literature
American memoirs
Arbor House books
LGBT autobiographies
Memoirs set in Los Angeles
Non-fiction books about murders in the United States
Lana Turner